Wang Zhiyi (born 29 April 2000) is a Chinese badminton player from Shashi, Jingzhou, in Hubei province. She started her career as a badminton player by training in Jingzhou sports school. She went to the Hubei provincial training centre in 2009, and was selected to join the team in 2013. In 2016, Wang joined the national team, and became part of the national second team in 2017. She was the girls' singles champion at the 2018 Asian Junior Championships, and also helped the national team to clinch the mixed team title. Wang represented her country at the 2018 Summer Youth Olympics in Buenos Aires, Argentina, and clinched the girls' singles silver. She won the women's singles title at the 2022 Asian Championships, which is the biggest title of her career.

Achievements

Asian Championships 
Women's singles

Youth Olympic Games 
Girls' singles

World Junior Championships 
Girls' singles

Asian Junior Championships 
Girls' singles

BWF World Tour (3 titles, 3 runners-up) 
The BWF World Tour, which was announced on 19 March 2017 and implemented in 2018, is a series of elite badminton tournaments sanctioned by the Badminton World Federation (BWF). The BWF World Tour is divided into levels of World Tour Finals, Super 1000, Super 750, Super 500, Super 300 (part of the HSBC World Tour), and the BWF Tour Super 100.

Women's singles

BWF International Challenge/Series (4 titles, 1 runner-up) 
Women's singles

  BWF International Challenge tournament
  BWF International Series tournament

BWF Junior International (4 titles) 
Girls' singles

  BWF Junior International Grand Prix tournament
  BWF Junior International Challenge tournament
  BWF Junior International Series tournament
  BWF Junior Future Series tournament

Record against selected opponents 
Record against Year-end Finals finalists, World Championships semi-finalists, and Olympic quarter-finalists. Accurate as of 28 October 2022.

References

External links 

 

2000 births
Living people
People from Jingzhou
Badminton players from Hubei
Chinese female badminton players
Badminton players at the 2018 Summer Youth Olympics